The Fédération Internationale de Motocyclisme (FIM) is the global governing/sanctioning body of motorcycle racing. It represents 116 national motorcycle federations that are divided into six regional continental unions.

There are seven motorcycle-racing disciplines that FIM covers, encompassing 82 world championships as well as hundreds of secondary championships: enduro, trial, circuit racing, motocross and supermoto, cross-country, e-bike, and track racing. FIM is also involved in many non-racing activities that promote the sport, its safety, and support relevant public policy. The FIM is also the first international sporting federation to publish an Environmental Code, in 1994. In 2007, a Commission for Women in Motorcycling was created by the FIM in order to promote the use of powered two-wheelers and the motorcycle sport among women.

History
The FIM was born from the Fédération Internationale des Clubs Motocyclistes (FICM), which itself was founded in Paris, France, on 21 December 1904. The British Auto-Cycle Union was one of the founding members. In 1906, the FICM was dissolved, but reborn in 1912 with the headquarters now located in England. The Six Days Reliability Trial was held the next year, the first international event held by the new incarnation.

The name was changed to the Fédération Internationale Motocycliste (FIM) in 1949, the same year that also saw the first race of the famed Road Racing World Championship Grand Prix. The headquarters were transferred to Geneva, Switzerland in 1959.

1994 saw the headquarters relocated, this time to Mies, Switzerland, and occupy its own building for the first time, shaped like a stylized motorcycle wheel. The name was changed again in 1998 to the Fédération Internationale de Motocyclisme at the congress in Cape Town, South Africa. The same year, the FIM was given provisional status of recognition by the International Olympic Committee, and gained full status in 2000 at the 2000 Summer Olympics in Sydney, Australia.

2004 marked the organization's centenary, and celebrations were held at the congress in Paris in October. Since 2018, Jorge Viegas (Portugal) is President of the FIM.

Due to the 2022 Russian invasion of Ukraine, on March 6, 2022, FIM banned all Russian and Belarusian motorcycle riders, teams, officials, and competitions.

FIM competitions

Road racing
 FIM Grand Prix motorcycle racing
 FIM Superbike World Championship
 FIM Supersport World Championship
 FIM Supersport 300 World Championship
 FIM Endurance World Championship
 FIM Sidecar World Championship
 FIM CEV Moto2 European Championship
 FIM JuniorGP World Championship
 European Talent Cup
 MotoE World Cup
 Asia Road Racing Championship
 Asia Talent Cup
 British Talent Cup
 Northern America Talent Cup
 Northern Talent Cup
 FIM MiniGP

Off-road racing
 FIM World Rally-Raid Championship
 FIM Bajas World Cup
 FIM World Enduro Championship
 FIM Hard Enduro World Championship
 International Six Days Enduro
 FIM SuperEnduro World Championship
 FIM Motocross World Championship
 FIM Women's Motocross World Championship
 Motocross des Nations
 FIM Supercross World Championship
 FIM Sidecarcross World Championship
 FIM Snowcross World Championship
 FIM Trial World Championship
 Trial des Nations
 FIM Speedway World Championship
 FIM Speedway World Cup
 FIM Speedway Under-21 World Championship
 FIM Team Speedway Under-21 World Championship
 FIM Individual Ice Speedway World Championship
 FIM Ice Speedway of Nations
 FIM Individual Speedway Long Track World Championship
 FIM Team Long Track World Championship
 FIM Supermoto World Championship
 Supermoto of Nations
 FIM Freestyle Motocross World Championship
 FIM E-Xbike World Cup Race (Electric bicycle)

FIM motorcycle racing helmet testing and homologation
In 2019, the FIM decided to implement its own helmet testing regime. Helmet manufacturers have to submit helmets for testing, and the FIM then lab tests them to make sure they are up to the job of protecting racers.

Members

See also
 Fédération Internationale de l'Automobile
 Outline of motorcycles and motorcycling
 SHARP (helmet ratings)

References

External links
 Official website 

 
International sports bodies based in Switzerland
Motorcycle
Motorcycle racing organizations
Motorcyclists organizations
Motorsport governing bodies
Motorsport in Switzerland
Sport in the canton of Vaud